State Route 141 (SR 141) is an east–west highway in Middle Tennessee. The road begins southeast of Westmoreland and ends in Silver Point.

SR 141 is one of very few state routes in Tennessee that actually changes its cardinal directions, from north-south to east-west, which happens in Lebanon at the second intersection with US 70.

Route description

Macon County

SR 141 begins in Macon County at an intersection with SR 52 southeast of Westmoreland. It goes southward as Green Grove Road and passes through the mountains of the Highland Rim before entering farmland and crossing into Trousdale County.

Trousdale County

SR 141 continues southeast and has an intersection with SR 260 before entering Hartsville. The highway then runs a short concurrency with SR 10 and SR 25 before turning south again as Broadway toward downtown Hartsville. In downtown, SR 141 turns east for two blocks as East Main Street then once again turns south as River Street. upon leaving Hartsville. After leaving Hartsville, SR 141 crosses the Cumberland River and is briefly known only as Highway 141 before crossing into Wilson County.

Wilson County

SR 141, now known as Hartsville Pike, turns southwest and continues  through farmland to enter Lebanon. The highway then passes through several neighborhoods before becoming concurrent with US 70/SR 26 as East High Street. They go east through a business district before turning south and coming to an intersection with the eastern end of US 70 Bus, the western end of US 70N, and SR 24. SR 141 then splits off of US 70/SR 26, where it switches cardinal directions from north-south to east-west, and heads east as Trousdale Ferry Pike while running parallel to I-40. The highway then passes through Tuckers Crossroads before crossing into Smith County.

Smith County

SR 141 then enters New Middleton and has an interchange with I-40 at Exit 254, where it moves to the south side of the interstate and begins a concurrency with SR 53. SR 141/SR 53 runs closely parallel to the interstate, crossing over the interstate and then back under it before entering Gordonsville.

Upon entering Gordonsville, SR 141 ends its concurrency with SR 53 and starts one with SR 264. This concurrency continues east through town before ending east of town. SR 141 continues southeast, then south, and then southeast once again as it traverses rugged terrain. It then crosses Smith Fork Creek and enters the small community of Lancaster as the road is generally heading east. After leaving Lancaster, SR 141 abruptly turns south-southwestward and closely parallels the Caney Fork River as it enters DeKalb County.

DeKalb County

SR 141 continues generally southward until reaching Center Hill Dam. At this point, SR 141 starts a concurrency with SR 96. This concurrency turns northeastward and goes across the dam, then SR 96 splits off at a four-way intersection with Edgar Evins State Park Road and Medley-Amonette Road (SR 96). SR 141 continues east as Wolf Creek Road through hilly terrain before crossing into Putnam County.

Putnam County

SR 141, now known as Center Hill Dam Road, tops a hill onto the Highland Rim, before winding its way into Silver Point. SR 141 then passes through the center of the community before reaching its eastern terminus at SR 56, just feet from that highway's interchange with I-40 (Exit 273).

Major intersections

See also

References 

141
141
141
141
141
141
141